Cyanodictyon is a genus of cyanobacteria belonging to the family Synechococcaceae.

The species of this genus are found in Europe.

Species:

Cyanodictyon balticum 
Cyanodictyon endophyticum 
Cyanodictyon filiforme 
Cyanodictyon iac 
Cyanodictyon planctonicum 
Cyanodictyon planctonicum 
Cyanodictyon reticulatum 
Cyanodictyon tropicalis 
Cyanodictyon tubiforme

References

Synechococcales
Cyanobacteria genera